Jean Dave (1531–1595) was a prelate in the Habsburg Netherlands who briefly served as the third bishop of Namur.

Life
Dave was born in Namur. He took degrees in theology and canon law, and served as ecclesiastical councillor on the provincial council of Namur. In 1580 he was appointed provost of the cathedral chapter. By letters patent of 22 June 1590 he was appointed ecclesiastical councillor to the Great Council of Mechelen, and the following year he became a canon of St. Rumbold's Cathedral. On 25 March 1593, Philip II of Spain proposed him as bishop of Namur, and the pope confirmed the appointment early in 1594. Dave was consecrated bishop in Antwerp on 18 September 1594, by Laevinus Torrentius, with co-consecrators Ghisbertus Masius, bishop of 's-Hertogenbosch, and Francisco de Ribera, bishop of Leighlin. He was installed in Namur on 23 October 1594, and died there on 3 March 1595.

References

1531 births
1595 deaths
Clergy from Bruges
16th-century Roman Catholic bishops in the Holy Roman Empire
Bishops of Namur